Racoon are a Dutch rock band, formed in 1997. Their first big appearance was at the 1999 Noorderslagfestival. The first album, Till Monkeys Fly, appeared in January 2000, produced by Michael Schoots (Urban Dance Squad). The first single, "Feel Like Flying", became a hit and got a lot of airplay on the Dutch radio station 3FM. The band's biggest hit so far came in 2005, when its single "Love You More" reached number three on the Dutch music charts.

Members 
 Bart van der Weide - Lead vocals
 Maarten van Damme - Bass (2017-present)
 Dennis Huige - Guitars
 Paul Bukkens - Drums
Live member since 2007:
 Manu van Os - Keyboards

Previous member(s) 
 Stefan de Kroon - Bass (1997-2017)

History 
Racoon started in 1997 as an acoustic duo made up of singer Bart van der Weide and guitarist Dennis Huige. The duo released three songs on the singer/songwriter compilation album Characters, released by the Dutch Rock & Pop Institute. In 1998, they were joined by bass player Stefan de Kroon and drummer Paul Bukkens and the band moved to Utrecht. That year, Racoon played at the Heineken X-pl'oor-festival in the Melkweg and in Rotterdam. Their self-released demo It's an Ice Cream Day earned them the attention of several record companies and many positive reviews from the Dutch press. In 1999, Racoon served as the opening act at the annual Noorderslag festival. They were signed to Sony's S.M.A.R.T. label and at the end of this year they went into the studio to record their full-length debut.

In January 2000, Racoon played at the Eurosonic festival in Groningen, also releasing their debut album Till Monkeys Fly, which was recorded at the ICP-studios in Brussels. The album was produced by Michel "Magic Stick" Schoots from Urban Dance Squad; the end mix was done by Phil Nicolo and Bob Ludwig was responsible for the mastering of the album. The band was being touted as "the next big thing" and their single "Feel Like Flying" was a power play on Radio 3 FM. Racoon also played at the Parkpop and Lowlands festivals. This was followed in 2001 with singles "Smoothly" and "Eric's Bar" and a new album in 2001 titled new album Here We Go, Stereo also touring the country and performing Faith No More songs for the Marlboro Flashback Tour.

In 2003, Racoon took part in the Europe Day festival in Kyiv, an international event organized by the European Union. Other bands on the bill included Alphaville from Germany, The Blueberries  from Denmark, K-System from Finland amongst many. 2004 saw Racoon signing a record deal with PIAS. The popular "Feel Like Flying" was runner up in the Top 100 Best Dutch Pop Songs voted for by the listeners of public Radio 3FM just behind winner, Van Dik Hout's "Stil in mij". Snippets of a Racoon track called "Reach" was also used in two Calvé TV ads.

In 2005, Racoon released their third album called Another Day, a major hit with highly successful singles such as "Love You More", "Laugh About It" and "Brother". In 2006, Racoon collaborated with Armin van Buuren to create a trance version of their hit tune "Love You More". The collaboration proved popular in the trance scene and was soon being played by many top name DJs.

In 2008, the band released its fourth album, Before You Leave with the band being present at many Dutch Festivals and playing in front of thousands of visitors during Pinkpop, Rockin Park and Parkpop events. In the fall of the same year, they had a successful tour in Dutch theaters that continued into the following year. In May 2011, Racoon released their fifth album, called Liverpool Rain. It was produced by Wouter Van Belle and recorded in Powertone Studios near Mechelen (Belgium) and in Abbey Road Studios in London where they played together with the London Chamber Orchestra, arranged by Andrew Powell. Some of the vocal takes from those London sessions made it onto the album. Their biggest hit so far came from the album called "No Mercy".

Discography

Albums
2000: Till Monkeys Fly (Sony Records)
2001: Here We Go Stereo (Sony)
2005: Another Day (Sony)
2008: Before You Leave (Sony)
2009: Live at Chasse Theatre, Breda (live)
2011: Liverpool Rain
2013: The Singles Collection (compilation)
2015: All in Good Time
2016: Live at HML, Amsterdam (live)
2017: Look Ahead and See the Distance
2021:

Singles
2000: "Feel Like Flying"
2000: "Blue Days"
2001: "Eric's Bar"
2005: "Happy Family"
2005: "Love You More"
2005: "Laugh About It"
2006: "Brother"
2007: "Close Your Eyes"
2008: "Lucky All My Life"
2008: "Clean Again" 
2011: "No Mercy"
2011: "Took a Hit" 
2011: "Don't Give Up the Fight"
2012: "Liverpool Rain" 
2012: "Freedom"
2012: "Oceaan"
2013: "Shoes of Lightning" 
2014: "Brick by Brick"
2015: "Guilty"
2017: "Bring it on"
2018: "Soon"
2020: "Het is Al Laat Toch"
2020: "De Echte Vent"
2021: "Hee Joh Jip"
2021: "Geef Je Hart Niet Zomaar Weg"

Featured in
2006: "Love You More" (Armin van Buuren featuring Racoon)

Dutch alternative rock groups
Roadrunner Records artists
Musical groups established in 1997
Musical groups from Zeeland
Goes